Milan Horyna (born January 9, 1939 in Hradec Králové) is a Czechoslovak retired slalom canoeist who competed from the late 1950s to the early 1970s. He won a four medals at the ICF Canoe Slalom World Championships with three silvers (C-2: 1967; C-2 team: 1967, 1959) and a bronze (C-2 team: 1971).

Horyna also finished 11th in the C-2 event at the 1972 Summer Olympics in Munich.

References

Sports-reference.com profile

1939 births
Canoeists at the 1972 Summer Olympics
Czechoslovak male canoeists
Living people
Olympic canoeists of Czechoslovakia
Medalists at the ICF Canoe Slalom World Championships
Sportspeople from Hradec Králové